Glenea relicta is a species of beetle in the family Cerambycidae. It was described by Francis Polkinghorne Pascoe in 1868.

Subspecies
 Glenea relicta izuinsularis Fujita, 1980
 Glenea relicta relicta Pascoe, 1868

References

relicta
Beetles described in 1868